Delirium is a common and serious problem, particularly impacting older adults during hospitalization, acute illness, ICU stay, or surgery. Created in 1990 by Dr. Sharon Inouye, the Confusion Assessment Method (CAM) rapidly became among the most widely used tools for identification of delirium, since it provided a quick, accurate, and standardized approach.

The Confusion Assessment Method (CAM) is a diagnostic tool developed to allow physicians and nurses to identify delirium in the healthcare setting. It was designed to be brief (less than 5 minutes to perform) and based on criteria from the third edition-revision of the Diagnostic and Statistical Manual of Mental Disorders (DSM-III-R). The CAM rates four diagnostic features, including acute onset and fluctuating course, inattention, disorganized thinking, and altered level of consciousness. The CAM requires that a brief cognitive test is performed before it is completed. It has been translated into more than 20 languages and adapted for use across multiple settings.

Elements of Score 
The CAM consists of a short and long form. The CAM short form assesses four features: 1. acute onset or fluctuating course, 2. inattention, 3. disorganized thinking, and 4. altered level of consciousness. The CAM-long form includes the short-form features and adds disorientation, memory impairment, perceptual disturbances, psychomotor agitation or retardation, and altered sleep-walk cycle. These features are based on the 9 features of delirium from DSM-III-R. Each feature is scored as present or absent. Delirium is considered present based on the CAM diagnostic algorithm: presence of (acute onset or fluctuating course -AND‐ inattention) ‐AND EITHER‐ (disorganized thinking or altered level of consciousness) (Table 1). Detailed training and scoring instructions are available here.

Interpretation 
In the original study, the 3-5-minute CAM assessment was validated against a >90 minute assessment by reference standard geriatric psychiatrists using DSM-III-R, and found to have a sensitivity and specificity of 94-100% and 90-95%, respectively, for identification of delirium. In a systematic review of 7 high quality studies involving >1000 patients, CAM was found to have a sensitivity of 94%, 95% CI 91-97%; and specificity of 89%, 95% CI 85-94%. A 2013 systematic review of 22 studies involving >2400 patients found a sensitivity of 82%, 95% CI 69-91%; and specificity of 99%, 95% CI 87-100%.

A large high-quality STARD-compliant diagnostic randomized controlled trial published in 2019 comparing the CAM with the 4AT delirium detection tool found that the CAM had lower sensitivity than the 4AT, with the two tools showing similar specificity. Though some studies show good performance of the CAM in research settings, large scale studies of detection of delirium in real-world clinical practice show that the CAM shows a lower sensitivity (as judged by positive score rates in relation to estimated delirium rates) of around 30-40%.

Adaptations 
The table below describes delirium assessment tools based on the CAM, their scoring, and available translations. Additional information (for example: administration and instrument validity) may be found here.

To Learn More 

 https://deliriumnetwork.org/
 https://help.agscocare.org/productAbstract
 https://www.marcusinstituteforaging.org/research/aging-brain-center

References 

Mental disorders screening and assessment tools
Intensive care medicine
Geriatric psychiatry